Romeo Bégin (born 12 December 1895, date of death unknown) was an Ontario political figure. He represented Russell in the Legislative Assembly of Ontario as a Liberal from 1937 to 1948.

He was born in Eastview in 1895, the son of Joseph Bégin. In 1923, he married Anna Carle. Bégin served as treasurer for Eastview for fifteen years. He was also director of the Eastview Bus Service.

References
Histoire des Comtes Unis de Prescott et de Russell, L. Brault (1963)
Canadian Parliamentary Guide, 1947, GP Normandin

External links

1895 births
Year of death missing
Ontario Liberal Party MPPs
Franco-Ontarian people